William Herbert Geyer, Jr. (October 3, 1919 – June 4, 2004) was a professional American football halfback in the National Football League. He played three seasons for the Chicago Bears (1942–1943, 1946).

See also
 List of NCAA major college yearly punt and kickoff return leaders

1919 births
2004 deaths
Bloomfield High School (New Jersey) alumni
People from Bloomfield, New Jersey
Players of American football from New Jersey
Sportspeople from Essex County, New Jersey
American football halfbacks
Colgate Raiders football players
Chicago Bears players